There were four cycling events at the 2014 South American Games: road cycling, track cycling, mountain bike and BMX racing, adding up to 28 events.

Medal summary

Medal table

Road cycling

Track cycling

Mountain biking

4th place in the men's mountain biking was Colombia.

BMX

References

Cycling
2014
South American Games
Cycle races in Chile